The Oxford Internet Institute (OII) is a multi-disciplinary department of social and computer science dedicated to the study of information, communication, and technology, and is a part of the Social Sciences Division of the University of Oxford, England.

Overview
The OII is housed over three sites on St Giles in Oxford, including a primary site at 1 St Giles, owned by Balliol College. The department undertakes research and teaching devoted to understanding life online, with the aim of shaping Internet research, policy, and practice.

Founded in 2001, the OII has tracked the Internet's development and use, aiming to shed light on individual, collective, and institutional behaviour online. The department brings together academics from a wide range of disciplines including political science, sociology, geography, economics, philosophy, physics and psychology.

The current director is Professor Victoria Nash.

Research
Research at the OII covers a huge variety of topics, with faculty publishing journal articles and books on issues including privacy and security, e-government and e-democracy, virtual economies, smart cities, digital exclusion, digital humanities, online gaming, big data and Internet geography. The OII currently has the following research clusters reflecting the diverse expertise of faculty: 
 Digital Politics and Government 
 Information Governance, and Security
 Social Data Science 
 Connectivity, Inclusion, and Inequality
 Internet Economies 
 Digital Knowledge and Culture 
 Education, Digital Life, and Wellbeing
 Ethics and Philosophy of Information

The research conducted at the OII covers a wide range of topics in Internet studies and the social impact of online technologies. Online politics, online education, social media and mental health, Internet-based collaboration, online dating, digital economy, the geography of the internet, and ethical and legal aspects of online technologies are among the main research topics followed at the Oxford Internet Institute.

Studies of Wikipedia
OII has published several studies on Internet geography and Wikipedia. In November 2011, The Guardian Data Blog published maps of geotagged Wikipedia articles written in English, Arabic, Egyptian Arabic, French, Hebrew and Persian. OII researcher Mark Graham led the study and published the results on his blog, Zero Geography.

Graham also leads an OII project focused on how new users are perceived, represented, and incorporated into the Wikipedia community.

In 2013, OII researchers led by Taha Yasseri published a study of controversial topics in 10 different language versions of Wikipedia, using data related to "edit wars".

The OII has also been involved in research on the effects of computational propaganda, the ethics of big data in different contexts and the political implications of the Internet and social media. It collaborates with other institutions of the University of Oxford such as the Reuters Institute for the Study of Journalism, the Department of Computer Science, and the Oxford Martin School.

In 2020, OII researcher Fabian Stephany and his colleague Hamza Salem published a study on using information-seeking behaviour patterns of Wikipedia users to predict US congressional elections. Their model accurately predicted the election outcome for 31 of 35 states in the 2020 United States Senate elections.

Studies of Internet Economics 
Several researchers at the OII study the digital economy. The OII is home of the Online Labour Index (OLI), the first economic indicator measuring the activity of the global online gig-economy, which was created and is administered by the OII researchers Otto Kässi, Vili Lehdonvirta, and Fabian Stephany. The index is a globally recognised reference for the measurement of the online freelance economy. Since 2021, the Online Labour Index is hosted on a new research hub, the Online Labour Observatory jointly administered by the OII and the International Labour Organisation.

In 2020, OII researchers initiated the CoRisk Index, the first economic indicator of industry risk assessments related to COVID-19.

Teaching
Since 2006, the OII has offered a DPhil (doctoral) degree in "Information, Communication, and the Social Sciences." Since 2009, it has offered a one-year Master of Science (MSc) degree in "Social Science of the Internet". From 2015, prospective students can apply to study the MSc degree part-time over two years. In addition, the department also runs an annual Summer Doctoral Programme which brings outstanding PhD students to study at the OII for two weeks each July. From 2018, prospective students also have the option to apply for a one-year Master of Science degree in Social Data Science with the related DPhil in Social Data Science available from 2020 onward.

History
The Oxford Internet Institute was made possible by a major donation from the Shirley Foundation of over £10m, with public funding totalling over £5m from the Higher Education Funding Council for England.

The idea originated with Derek Wyatt MP and Andrew Graham, then Master-Elect of Balliol.  Two Balliol Alumni, who knew Dame Stephanie from The Worshipful Company of Information Technologists, persuaded Dame Stephanie to meet Andrew Graham and it was following their meeting that she agreed to give the idea her support.

The Oxford Internet Institute is part of a small network of research centres that includes the centres like the Berkman Klein Center for Internet & Society and Information Society Project at the Yale Law School. But it is the only one that functions as a fully functioning, degree-granting department.

Directors
 Andrew Graham Acting (2001–2002)
 William H. Dutton (2002–2011)
 Helen Margetts (2011–2018)
 Philip N. Howard (2018–2021)
 Victoria Nash (2021–present)

Faculty 

 Helen Margetts
 Luciano Floridi
 Philip N. Howard
 Vili Lehdonvirta
 Viktor Mayer-Schönberger
 Gina Neff
 Taha Yasseri
 Sandra Wachter

OII awards
For its 10th anniversary, the OII launched the OII awards for lifetime achievement awards on the internet research field and the Internet & Society awards for significant recent contribution to develop the internet for public good.

See also

Berkeley Center for Law and Technology at Boalt Hall
Berkman Klein Center for Internet & Society
Information Society Project at Yale Law School
Haifa Center for Law & Technology at Haifa University
Centre for Internet and Society (India)
iLabour Project

References

External links
Oxford Internet Institute website

2001 establishments in England
Research institutes established in 2001
Internet Institute
Internet Institute
Balliol College, Oxford
Information technology research institutes
Internet in England